Richard Edward Raymond (born October 27, 1960) is a Democratic member of the Texas House of Representatives for District 42, which encompasses western Webb County and includes the city of Laredo. He is Chairman of the Defense & Veterans' Affairs Committee and is a member of the State Affairs committee.

Election history

2006

2004

2002

2001

1998

1996

1994

1992

Notes

References 
Official biography, Texas House of Representatives
Richard Raymond campaign website

1960 births
Living people
People from Alice, Texas
People from King County, Washington
People from Duval County, Texas
Democratic Party members of the Texas House of Representatives
People from Laredo, Texas
Laredo Community College alumni
University of Texas at Austin College of Liberal Arts alumni
University of Texas School of Law alumni
Texas lawyers
American politicians of Mexican descent
Activists for Hispanic and Latino American civil rights
Activists from Texas
21st-century American politicians